The 2014 British Indoor Athletics Championships was an indoor track and field competition held from 8–9 February 2014 at the English Institute of Sport, Sheffield, England. A full range of indoor events were held.

At this event, Katarina Johnson-Thompson broke the women's British record in the high jump.

The event acted as the trials for the World Championships that year in Sopot, Poland.

Medal summary

Men

Women

References 

 

British Indoor Championships
British Indoor Athletics Championships
Sports competitions in Sheffield
Athletics Indoor
Athletics competitions in England